Billbergia nutans, or Queen's-tears, is an epiphytic bromeliad native to Brazil, Paraguay, Uruguay, and Argentina.

This plant is often used as an ornamental plant.

Varieties
Two varieties are recognized:

Billbergia nutans var. nutans - Brazil, Paraguay, Uruguay, and Argentina
Billbergia nutans var. schimperiana (Wittm. ex Baker) Mez  -  Brazil, Paraguay

Cultivars 

 Billbergia 'Albertii'
 Billbergia 'Baraquiniano-Nutans'
 Billbergia 'Beadleberg'
 Billbergia 'Blireiana'
 Billbergia 'Candy'
 Billbergia 'Carminea'
 Billbergia 'Elvenia Slosson'
 Billbergia 'Frau Pia Roesslein'
 Billbergia 'Hoelscheriana'
 Billbergia 'Intermedia'
 Billbergia 'Ivey Meyer'
 Billbergia 'Joseph Marechal'
 Billbergia 'Kahibah'
 Billbergia 'Leodiensis'
 Billbergia 'Lissom'
 Billbergia 'Marechalii'
 Billbergia 'Morreniana'
 Billbergia 'Pioupionii'
 Billbergia 'Rosea'
 Billbergia 'Rubro-Cyanea'
 Billbergia 'Salmonea'
 Billbergia 'Theodore L. Mead'
 Billbergia 'Ultrajactensis'
 Billbergia 'Vittato-Nutans'
 Billbergia 'Wantenii'
 Billbergia 'Windii'
 Billbergia 'Worleana'
 × Billmea 'Emma Francis Stewart'
 × Billnelia 'Fred Eichholtz'
 × Billnelia 'Perringiana'
 × Cryptbergia 'Mead'
 × Cryptbergia 'Pinkie'
 × Cryptbergia 'Red Burst'
 × Cryptbergia 'Rubra'
 × Neobergia 'Noddy'
 × Neobergia 'Perneri'
 × Nidbergia 'Chas Hodgson'

References

External links
Billbergia nutans photos

nutans
Epiphytes
Flora of Brazil
Flora of Argentina
Flora of Paraguay
Flora of Uruguay
Plants described in 1869
Garden plants of South America